Silk purse may refer to:

 Silk Purse (Linda Ronstadt album)
 Operation Silk Purse